The 1958–59 Divizia A was the forty-first season of Divizia A, the top-level football league of Romania.

Teams

League table

Results

Top goalscorers

Champion squad

See also 

 1958–59 Divizia B

References

Liga I seasons
Romania
1958–59 in Romanian football